Metatropis rufescens is a species of true bugs. The species is found in Europe, with the exception of the far North and South then East to the Black Sea region and across the Palearctic to Siberia. In Central Europe it is common, but it is not found everywhere. In the British Isles it is common in the South including Wales and Ireland. It occurs in shady, mostly moist habitats in deciduous forests.

Metatropis rufescens feeds exclusively on Circaea (Circaea lutetiana), Circaea x intermedia and in the Alps Circaea alpina. They feed predominantly on the reproductive organs of the plants. Overwintering occurs as an imago under loose bark or dry ground litter. Mating occurs in May. Flight-active bugs are found not only on the food plant, but also on other herbaceous plants and even trees. The females lay their eggs individually in June and July on the stems and leaves of Circaea. From August, sometimes also in July, the imagines of the new generation occur, and nymphs can be found until September.

References

 Ekkehard Wachmann, Albert Melber, Jürgen Deckert: Wanzen. Band 3: Pentatomomorpha I: Aradoidea (Rindenwanzen), Lygaeoidea (Bodenwanzen u. a.), Pyrrhocoroidea (Feuerwanzen) und Coreoidea (Randwanzen u. a.). (= Die Tierwelt Deutschlands und der angrenzenden Meeresteile nach ihren Merkmalen und nach ihrer Lebensweise. 78. Teil). Goecke & Evers, Keltern 2007, .

Berytidae
Articles containing video clips
Hemiptera of Europe